Below is the list of asteroid close approaches to Earth in 2015.

Timeline of known close approaches less than one lunar distance from Earth in 2015 
A list of known near-Earth asteroid close approaches less than 1 lunar distance (384,400 km or 0.00256 AU) from Earth in 2015.

Note this data does not include any of the 43 objects that collided with earth in 2015, none of which were discovered in advance, but were recorded by sensors designed to detect detonation of nuclear devices (of the 43 objects detected, 2 had an impact energy greater than that of a 1 kiloton device).

Warning Times by Size 
This sub-section visualises the warning times of the close approaches listed in the above table, depending on the size of the asteroid. The sizes of the charts show the relative sizes of the asteroids to scale. For comparison, the approximate size of a person is also shown. This is based the absolute magnitude of each asteroid, an approximate measure of size based on brightness.

Abs Magnitude 30 and greater
 (size of a person for comparison)

Abs Magnitude 29-30

Absolute Magnitude 28-29

Absolute Magnitude 27-28

Absolute Magnitude 26-27

Notes

Additional examples

An example list of near-Earth asteroids that passed more than 1 lunar distance (384,400 km or 0.00256 AU) from Earth in 2015.
 (~50 meters in diameter) passed 5.57 lunar distances from Earth on 18 January 2015.
 (~60 meters in diameter) passed 1.64 lunar distances from Earth (1.50 lunar distances from the Moon) on 20 January 2015.
 (~700 meters in diameter) passed 3.1 lunar distances (1.2 million km) from Earth on 26 January 2015.
 (~70 meters in diameter) passed  from Earth on 15 February 2015.
 (~500 meters in diameter) passed 11.7 lunar distances (4 million km) from Earth on 2015 Mar 27.
 (~110 meters in diameter) passed 3.6 lunar distances (1.38 million km) (3.2 lunar distances from the Moon) (1.21 million km) on 1 April 2015.
 (~80 meters in diameter) passed 1.15 lunar distances (440,000 km) (1.08 lunar distances from the Moon) (410,000 km) on 7 July 2015.
 (~15 meters in diameter) passed 1.005 lunar distances (390,000 km) on 7 October 2015
2014 UR (~20 meters in diameter) passed 3.81 lunar distances (1.46 million km) from Earth on 18 October 2015.
 (~600 meters in diameter) passed 1.3 lunar distances (480,000 km) (0.74 lunar distances from the Moon) (286,000 km) on 31 October 2015.
 (~6 meters in diameter) passed 1.02 lunar distances (393,000 km) (0.85 lunar distances from the Moon) (327,000 km) on 24 November 2015
2015 YB initially calculated to make a close approach to Earth on 19 December 2015 turned out to be a much further away inner main-belt asteroid. On 31 December 2015 the asteroid received the designation .

Timeline of close approaches less than one Lunar distance from the Moon in 2015 
The number of asteroids listed here are significantly less than those of asteroids approaching Earth for several reasons:
 Asteroids approaching Earth not only move faster, but are brighter and are easier to detect with modern surveys due to these factors
 Asteroids approaching closer to Earth are higher priority to confirm, and only confirmed asteroids are listed with a lunocentric approach distance
 Those which make close approaches to the Moon are frequently lost in its glare, making them harder to confirm, and are more easily discovered during the new Moon, when the Moon is too close to the Sun for any asteroids to be detected while they are near to the Moon anyway.

These factors combined severely limit the amount of Moon-approaching asteroids, to a level many times lower than the detected asteroids to pass just as close to Earth instead.

Notes

See also 
List of asteroid close approaches to Earth
List of asteroid close approaches to Earth in 2014
List of asteroid close approaches to Earth in 2016

References

External links
PIA19647: Asteroid 1999 JD6 (Radar imaged July 25, 2015)

close approaches to Earth in 2015
Near-Earth asteroids